From. Victon (stylized as From. VICTON) is the fourth EP by the South Korean boy group Victon. It was released on November 9, 2017 with the lead single "Remember Me" by Plan A Entertainment and distributed by Kakao Entertainment.

Background and release 
The EP was released on the group's one year anniversary of debut. The EP contains six songs, including the lead single "Remember Me". Member Do Han-se contributed to writing on all six of the tracks, and all the member's of Victon participated in the writing of the song "Have a Good Night".

The music video for "Remember Me" featured labelmate Hayoung.

Commercial performance
The album peaked at number fourteen on the Gaon weekly album chart. By May 2020, the EP had sold 16,364 copies in South Korea.

Track listing

Charts

Weekly charts

Monthly chart

Sales

References 

2017 EPs
Korean-language EPs